Todd Martin and Pete Sampras were the defending champions but only Martin competed that year with Scott Davis.

Davis and Martin lost in the first round to Stefan Edberg and Petr Korda.

Todd Woodbridge and Mark Woodforde won in the final 6–3, 7–6 against Sébastien Lareau and Alex O'Brien.

Seeds
The top four seeded teams received byes into the second round.

Draw

Finals

Top half

Bottom half

References
 1996 Stella Artois Championships Doubles Draw

1996 Stella Artois Championships